St. Alban station is a railway station in the municipality of Dießen am Ammersee, in Bavaria, Germany. It is located on the Mering–Weilheim line of Deutsche Bahn.

Services
 the following services stop at St. Alban:

References

External links
 
 St. Alban layout 
 

Railway stations in Bavaria
Buildings and structures in Landsberg (district)